The Springfield High School of Science and Technology (HSST) is a public high school located in Springfield, Massachusetts, United States.  The high school is home to grades 9–12. As of September 2008, the student count was approximately 1,700 students. This makes Science and Technology the third largest high school in Springfield, behind Springfield Central High School and the High School of Commerce. It is located directly next to Springfield's Roger L Putnam Vocational-Technical High School and the two schools share school buses.

STEM 21

Beginning in 2008, with the class of 2012, Springfield High School of Science and Technology adapted the STEM 21 learning criteria. This generally separates the school into 'houses'.

The four houses are:

Biomedical, Biotechnology & Forensic.
Engineering.
Finance.
Information Technology, Film & Media.

This essentially turned Sci-Tech into one of Springfield's ever growing magnet schools. The hope is for more funding, and getting Sci-Tech to be the school it once was. Upperclassmen who were attending the school before the start of the program (classes of 2009, 2010 & 2011) are offered the STEM courses but not required to take them.

References

1950s architecture in the United States
Educational institutions established in 1996
High schools in Springfield, Massachusetts
Public high schools in Massachusetts
1996 establishments in Massachusetts